The 2009–10 Iowa State Cyclones men's basketball team represents Iowa State University during the 2009–10 NCAA Division I men's basketball season. The Cyclones were coached by Greg McDermott, who was in his 4th season. They played their home games at Hilton Coliseum in Ames, Iowa and competed in the Big 12 Conference.

Previous season

The Cyclones finished 15-17, and 4-12 in Big 12 play to finish 10th in the regular season conference standings.  They lost to Oklahomas State in the first round of the Big 12 tournament.

Offseason departures

Recruiting

Roster

Schedule and results

|-
!colspan=12 style=""|Exhibition
|-

|-

|-
!colspan=12 style=""|Regular Season
|-

|-

|-

|-

|-

|-

|-

|-

|-

|-

|-

|-

|-

|-

|-

|-

|-

|-

|-
|-

|-

|-

|-

|-

|-

|-

|-

|-

|-

|-

|-
|-
|-
!colspan=12 style=""|Big 12 Tournament
|-
|-
|-

Awards and honors

All-Conference Selections

Craig Brackins (2nd Team)
Marquis Gilstrap (Honorable Mention)

Ralph A. Olsen Award

Craig Brackins (2009)

References

Iowa State Cyclones men's basketball seasons
Iowa State
Iowa State Cyc
Iowa State Cyc